Muli Strait (Malay: Selat Muli, formerly Salat Moeli), or Marianne Strait (colonial Dutch Straat Marianne), named after Princess Marianne of the Netherlands, is a strait in the Indonesian province of South Papua that separates the island of Yos Sudarso from coastal New Guinea to the east. At the southern end of Muli Strait is Komoran (Komolom) Island, with Buaya Strait (Bensbach Creek) separating it from Yos Sudarso to the north. Muli Strait was discovered by Europeans in 1826 by Dirk Hendrik Kolff.

See also
Muli Strait languages

Straits of Indonesia
Geography of South Papua